After the break-up of the Beatles in April 1970, John Lennon, Paul McCartney, George Harrison and Ringo Starr enjoyed success as solo artists and collaborated with each other on numerous occasions, including on both studio and live recordings. However, none of these collaborations included all four members, with the exception of "Free as a Bird" (1994) and "Real Love" (1995).

In the early 1970s, collaborations were common between Harrison and Starr, and between Lennon and either Harrison or Starr, but none of the three worked with McCartney over that time. The only album released during Lennon's lifetime that included compositions and performances by all four ex-Beatles, albeit on separate songs, was Starr's 1973 album Ringo. Starr's Ringo's Rotogravure (1976) also included compositions by all his bandmates (although Harrison did not play on the album), and the 1996 Carl Perkins album Go Cat Go! contained individual contributions by McCartney, Harrison and Starr, together with a Lennon recording from 1969. With Starr's participation, Harrison staged the Concert for Bangladesh in New York City in August 1971. Other than an unreleased jam session on March 28, 1974, later bootlegged as A Toot and a Snore in '74, Lennon and McCartney never recorded together again. Starr and McCartney have performed and recorded together on several occasions since Harrison's death in 2001.

Collaborations by the four ex-Beatles since the break-up are listed below. Collaborations that began before the break-up are included for historical interest. The start date of the collaboration, e.g., the recording start date, governs the initial display sequence. Other display sequences may be seen by clicking the buttons in the column headers.

Albums

Singles

Notes
 Promo single only
 Ono's B-side to Lennon's "Cold Turkey"
 Ono's B-side to Lennon's "Mother"
 Ono's B-side to Lennon's "Power to the People" in the US

Live performances

Live performances featuring collaboration between two or more ex-Beatles. Separate appearance at the same event does not count.

References

Sources
 
 

Timelines of music
The Beatles music
Beatles